Top Model Ghana was a weekly one-hour reality television series produced by 702 Productions, Ltd., and was aired on GTV. Inspired by but not licensed by America's Next Top Model, the objective of this program was to raise the caliber of young models in the country and enhancing the international perception of Ghanaian models. The grand prize was a working opportunity with a California modeling agency which was won by Mabel in the first and so far only Cycle.

Auditions were held all through the state of Ghana where Ghanaians were called for casting. Applicants were required to be from 18 to 24 years old at the time of application and at least 5'7" in height, to be eligible to meet the character criteria as set by Producer.

For 8 weeks, the 13 finalists lived in a house equipped with cameras and microphones. They were also evaluated by a panel of judges on both their filmed interactions and performance in challenges. These judges, including fashion industry experts, photographers, agency representatives, and a weekly guest judge (to judge in his or her areas of expertise) will eliminate one contestant each week until a winner emerged.

Each episode targeted a particular life skill and modeling requirement. Contestant's knowledge and familiarity with subject matter were tested in a challenge. Aspiring models were evaluated based on their performance in the challenges.

In the final the top 6 competed against each other in a pageant-style ceremony where every remaining girl was awarded a title such as Top Model Personality or Top Model Unique. Before the winner was announced the top 2 was determined whereas the ranking order between the other four remained unknown. At the end of the Show Mabel triumphed over Caroline and won the title Top Model Ghana 2006.

Series summary

Contestants
(ages stated at start of contest)

Call-out order

 The contestant was eliminated
 The contestant won the competition

In Week 8 was the final where only the top two was announced.
1The number of weeks does not imply the number of episodes as the Show sometimes aired more often a week.

References

Top Model
2006 Ghanaian television series debuts
2006 Ghanaian television series endings
Ghana Broadcasting Corporation original programming